Maurice Bombart (born 12 April 1926) was a Belgian boxer. He competed in the men's welterweight event at the 1948 Summer Olympics. At the 1948 Summer Olympics, he lost to Hank Herring of the United States.

References

External links

1926 births
Possibly living people
Belgian male boxers
Olympic boxers of Belgium
Boxers at the 1948 Summer Olympics
Place of birth missing
Welterweight boxers